David Alan Silman (born 28 October 1959) is an English retired professional football centre back who made one appearance in the Football League for Brentford. He went on to play for over a decade in non-league football and had a spell as player-manager of Hounslow.

Career statistics

References

1959 births
English footballers
English Football League players
Brentford F.C. players
Living people
Footballers from Hampstead
Association football central defenders
Wolverhampton Wanderers F.C. players
Queens Park Rangers F.C. players
Walthamstow Avenue F.C. players
Enfield F.C. players
Dagenham F.C. players
Harrow Borough F.C. players
Hayes F.C. players
Hounslow F.C. players
Tokyngton Manor F.C. players
Staines Town F.C. players
Isthmian League players
National League (English football) players